Greg Brock may refer to:

 Greg Brock (baseball) (born 1957), American baseball player
 Greg Brock (The West Wing), a fictional character on The West Wing